Justin Herman (April 29, 1907 – December 3, 1983) was an American screenwriter, film producer and director. He wrote for 42 films between 1934 and 1952. He was nominated for an Academy Award in 1950 for Roller Derby Girl and again in 1956 for Three Kisses.  Both nominations were in the category Best Short Subject. He was born in Philadelphia, Pennsylvania and died in New Hope, Pennsylvania.

Selected filmography
 Busy Little Bears (1939)
 Beauty and the Beach (1941)
 Who's Who in Animal Land (1944)
 Babies, They're Wonderful! - short (1947)

References

External links

1907 births
1983 deaths
American male screenwriters
Film producers from Pennsylvania
Writers from Philadelphia
Film directors from Pennsylvania
20th-century American businesspeople
Screenwriters from Pennsylvania
20th-century American male writers
20th-century American screenwriters